Banking in Nicaragua, prior to 1978, consisted of the Central Bank of Nicaragua and several domestic- and foreign-owned commercial banks. One of the first acts of the Sandinista government in 1979 was to nationalize the country’s banking system, in an "attempt to promote community banking and support the rural poor".

Foreign banks were allowed to continue their operations but could no longer accept local deposits. Private banks in Nicaragua were by law abolished in the 1980s and cooperatives were considered too politicized and dependent on subsidies. In 1985, a new degree loosened state control of the banking system by allowing the establishment of privately owned local exchange houses.

History
In 1990, the National Assembly passed legislation permitting private banks to resume operations. In 1991 a legislation allowed the establishment of the first private banks in the country, however only large industries and agribusiness producers of non-traditional crops for export qualified for credit thus leaving small business owners and producers of consumption crops with no access to loans or banking services.

In 1992, the largest stateowned commercial bank was the National Development Bank (Banco Nacional de Desarrollo - BND), originally established by Chase National Bank. Other state-owned commercial banks were the Bank of America (Banco de América - Bamer) and the Nicaraguan Bank of Industry and Commerce (Banco Nicaragüense de Industria y Comercio - Banic). The People's Bank (Banco Popular) specialized in business loans, and the Real Estate Bank (Banco Inmobilario - Bin) provided loans for housing. Three foreign banks continued operations: Bank of America, Citibank, and Lloyds Bank.

Restructure
The Inter-American Development Bank (IDB) was instrumental in restructuring Nicaragua's technically bankrupt banking sector. In December 1991, the IDB approved a US$3 million technical cooperation grant to restructure the Central Bank, and in March 1992, it approved a US$3 million loan to a new commercial bank, the Mercantile Bank (Banco Mercantil). The Mercantile Bank program was expected to make loans available to small and medium-sized private-sector enterprises and to finance investments to bolster fixed assets and create permanent working capital. The Mercantile Bank was the first private bank to be established in Nicaragua since 1979. Three additional new commercial banks were scheduled to open in 1992.

Restructuring of the National Financial System (Sistema Financiero Nacional - SFN) was one of the key elements of the government's economic reform program. According to an agreement between President Chamorro and the World Bank, Banic was to be merged with Bin. The BND would handle only rural credit operations, and the People's Bank was to take over all credit operations for small and medium-sized industry. International operations, which had been managed exclusively by the Central Bank since 1984, were transferred to the BND and Banic. The Central Bank would continue to handle operations pertaining to the central government, while the newly merged banks would be responsible for letters of credit, imports, transfers, and dollar checking accounts.

The Central Bank also auctioned off one of the government's largest exchange houses. This exchange house had been established in 1988 under the direction of the Financial Corporation of Nicaragua (Corporación Financiera de Nicaragua - Corfin). In 1989 the Central Bank authorized the exchange house to operate a foreign money exchange office as an agent of the bank. In May 1991, Corfin voted to turn over its shares in the exchange house to the Central Bank so that the exchange house could be sold.

Opponents charged that this sale was unconstitutional. They argued that the exchange house was the property of the Central Bank and could not be transferred. The Federation of Bank Workers also charged that the new government banking policy was weakening the state bank while giving the advantage to the private banks. Nicaragua had far fewer banking resources than its Central American counterparts by the end of 2002, with only six banks compared to the regional average of 107 per country.

See also

 List of banks in Nicaragua

References